José Pinto de Carvalho Santos Águas (9 November 1930 – 10 December 2000) was a Portuguese footballer who played as a striker.

He enjoyed a lengthy professional spell with Benfica, never scoring less than 18 goals in 12 of his 13 first division seasons. A prolific goalscorer, Águas was nicknamed "Cabeça de Ouro" ("Golden Head") because of his header skills.

Club career
Born in Luanda, Portuguese Angola, Portuguese Empire from a Portuguese colonial family, Águas started his footballing career with local team Lusitano do Lobito, before moving to S.L. Benfica in 1950 where he gained legendary status.

With Benfica he won the Primeira Liga five times (1955, 1957, 1960, 1961 and 1963) and the domestic cup seven, also being crowned national league's top scorer on five occasions. In the years previous to Eusébio's rise, he was also instrumental in the club's back-to-back European Cup conquests, in 1961 against FC Barcelona (3–2), and the next season against Real Madrid (5–3), scoring his team's first goal on both occasions and being club captain; he failed to complete a hat-trick of wins in the competition after the 1–2 defeat to A.C. Milan in the 1963 final (he did not play).

After leaving Benfica, Águas, aged 33, played one more season for FK Austria Wien, retiring the next summer. He died in Lisbon, at the age of 70 after a prolonged illness.

International career
Águas made his debut for Portugal on 23 November 1952, in a 1–1 draw with Austria, and went on to gain a total of 25 caps while scoring 11 times. His last appearance was on 17 May 1962, a 1–2 defeat against Belgium.

Personal life
Águas' son, Rui, was also a footballer and a striker. He too represented Benfica and the national team, as well as FC Porto.

His daughter, Helena Maria, known as Lena d'Água, has a career in pop music as a singer.

Career statistics

Club

International goals

Honours

Player
Benfica
Primeira Liga: 1954–55, 1956–57, 1959–60, 1960–61, 1962–63
Taça de Portugal: 1950–51, 1951–52, 1952–53, 1954–55, 1956–57, 1958–59, 1961–62
European Cup: 1960–61, 1961–62

Manager
Marítimo
AF Madeira Championship: 1966–97
Madeira Cup: 1966–97

Atlético
Segunda Divisão: 1967–68

Individual
Primeira Liga Top Scorer: 1951–52, 1955–56, 1956–57, 1958–59, 1960–61
European Cup Top Scorer: 1960–61
Taça de Portugal Top Scorer: 1950–51, 1952–53, 1954–55, 1957–58

See also
List of association football families

References

Further reading

External links

 
 
 

1930 births
2000 deaths
Colonial people in Angola
Footballers from Luanda
Portuguese footballers
Association football forwards
Primeira Liga players
S.L. Benfica footballers
Austrian Football Bundesliga players
FK Austria Wien players
Portugal international footballers
Portuguese expatriate footballers
Expatriate footballers in Austria
Portuguese expatriate sportspeople in Austria
Portuguese football managers
Leixões S.C. managers
UEFA Champions League winning players
UEFA Champions League top scorers